Karachi Expo Center is the convention center where Pakistani products are showcased internationally. The center consists of 8 halls. The Trade Development Authority of Pakistan also helps support the exhibitions at the center.

IDEAS exhibition

Pakistani military arms and equipment exhibitions are held under the theme 'IDEAS' (International Defence Exhibition and Seminar). This is a four-day exhibition.

'My Karachi' exhibition
Since 2003, 'My Karachi' themed exhibitions are held annually at Expo Center Karachi where companies and traders of Karachi as well as foreign exhibitors market their products. This three-day long exhibition is organized annually by the Karachi Chamber of Commerce and Industry (KCCI). The products are showcased for around one million visitors. This will provide a platform for business-to-business and business-to-consumer meetings. Importance of this exhibition is emphasized as city of Karachi is considered the economic and financial hub of Pakistan.

'Dawn All About Lifestyle' exhibition
Another prominent exhibition theme at Expo Center Karachi is 'Dawn Lifestyle'. It is sponsored by Dawn Media Group since 2001.

IT and Telecom Asia exhibition
Exhibition showcases IT and telecommunication technologies in 3-day exhibitions at Expo Center Karachi.

Vaccination Centre - Karachi East
Expo Center Karachi was converted into a 24-hour vaccination centre for the people of Karachi during covid-19 (2020-2021).

Specifications 

Karachi Expo Center buildings are centrally air conditioned, with many restaurants and parking areas for 2400 cars.

References

External links

Convention centres in Pakistan
Buildings and structures in Karachi